The Gloeoheppiaceae are a family of ascomycete fungi in the order Lichinales. There are seven species in the family. Most species are lichenized with cyanobacteria. Species in this family are mostly found in desert areas. The family was circumscribed in 1995 by German lichenologist Aino Henssen.

References

Lichinomycetes
Lichen families
Taxa named by Aino Henssen
Taxa described in 1995